Svenja Fölmli (born 19 August 2002) is a Swiss footballer who plays as a forward for SC Freiburg and the Switzerland national team. Her playing style has drawn comparisons with Kylian Mbappé.

Career
Fölmli made her debut for the Switzerland national team on 3 September 2019 against Lithuania, coming on as a substitute for Fabienne Humm.

References

2002 births
Living people
People from Sursee District
Swiss women's footballers
Women's association football forwards
Switzerland women's international footballers
Swiss Women's Super League players
Frauen-Bundesliga players
FC Luzern Frauen players
SC Freiburg (women) players
Swiss expatriate women's footballers
Expatriate women's footballers in Germany
Swiss expatriate sportspeople in Germany
Sportspeople from the canton of Lucerne
UEFA Women's Euro 2022 players